André Øvredal (born 1973) is a Norwegian film director and screenwriter. He is best known for directing the films Trollhunter, The Autopsy of Jane Doe and Scary Stories to Tell in the Dark.

Life and career
He is best known for writing and directing the film Trollhunter. Øvredal wrote for 20th Century Fox Television the pilot episode of action-horror television series Enormous, which is based on the comic book by the same name.

Filmography

Short films

Television

References

External links

1973 births
Living people
Norwegian film directors
Norwegian screenwriters
Norwegian film producers
Horror film directors